Bursera aromatica is a species of plant in the Burseraceae family. It is endemic to Jamaica.

References

Plants described in 1967
aromatica
Vulnerable plants
Endemic flora of Jamaica
Taxonomy articles created by Polbot